The Hall House is a historic house at 32 Edgehill Road in an exclusive neighborhood of Little Rock, Arkansas.  It is a large two-story brick structure, set on a manicured landscape and appearing as an English country house.  It has a two-story projecting entry pavilion, and large gabled dormers with half-timbered stucco finish.  Built in 1928, it is one of the largest and most expensive residential commissions of the noted Arkansas firm of Thompson, Sanders & Ginocchio.

The house was listed on the National Register of Historic Places in 1982.

See also
National Register of Historic Places listings in Little Rock, Arkansas

References

Houses on the National Register of Historic Places in Arkansas
Houses completed in 1928
Houses in Little Rock, Arkansas
National Register of Historic Places in Little Rock, Arkansas